Richard, Rich, Rick, or Dick Pierce may refer to:

People
Richard Pierce (historian) (1918–2004), American historian
Richard Pierce (publisher) (died 1691), printer of Publick Occurrences Both Forreign and Domestick 
Richard J. Pierce, American legal scholar at George Washington School of Law
Richard S. Pierce, co-author of the  Pierce–Birkhoff conjecture
Rick Pierce, American musician, member of TKO
Ricky Pierce (born 1959), American basketball player

Fictional characters
Richard Pierce, a character in the 2004 novel Little Children and the 2006 film adaptation
Richard Pierce, a character in the 1969 novel The Venom Business

See also
Richard Pearce (disambiguation)
Richard Pearse (1877–1953), New Zealand farmer and inventor